Yahya Boussakou (born 4 March 2000) is a Dutch professional footballer who plays as a forward for Eerste Divisie club SC Telstar.

Professional career
On 14 March 2019, Boussakou signed a professional contract with ADO Den Haag. He made his professional debut with ADO Den Haag in a 3–1 Eredivisie win over S.B.V. Excelsior on 25 April 2019.

Boussakou joined Eerste Divisie club Telstar on 12 August 2022.

Personal life
Born in the Netherlands, Boussakou is of Moroccan descent.

References

External links
 
 

2000 births
Living people
Footballers from The Hague
Dutch footballers
Dutch people of Moroccan descent
Association football forwards
ADO Den Haag players
SC Telstar players
Eredivisie players
Eerste Divisie players